The Egyptian intervention in Libya has been substantial since the beginning of the civil war. The intervention started after ISIL released a video of the beheading of 21 Egyptians on 12 February 2015. In response, Egypt launched airstrikes on 16 February of the same year. After that incident, Egypt became increasingly involved with Libya's internal politics.

Timeline

2015
On 12 February, 2015, ISIL released a video it of the group beheading Coptic Christians, all of which were Egyptians. Egypt, along with the Tobruk Government, launched airstrikes on 15 and 16 February, in Eastern Libya in response to the beheadings. Later on that year, on 19 July, at least 21 Egyptian troops were killed near the Libyan border by an Islamist group.

2018
Egypt and the UAE carried out multiple airstrikes in Derna in May, June, and September against ISIL. However, the Libyan Express released a video alleging that Egyptian soldiers were at the front line alongside the LNA.

2019
On 5 April, Egypt expressed its deep concern over a campaign in Tripoli and urged all sides to avoid escalation. Egypt also announced its commitment to UN efforts to find a political solution to the Libyan Crisis adding that a political solution is the only option. On 9 April, Egypt expressed support for the Libyan National Army and its push to dismantle all remaining militias, and also cautioned against foreign intervention in the conflict. On 14 April, President of Egypt, Abdel Fattah el-Sisi, met with LNA Field Marshal Khalifa Haftar in Cairo and announced his support for the LNA's counterterrorism efforts, stating that "the fight toward terrorism"..."allows the establishment of a stable and sovereign civil state, and will start the reconstruction of Libya in various fields."

2020
On July 5, Egyptian warplanes hit a place where it was alleged that Turkey was building a military base.

On July 19, The Egyptian President made public threats to the GNA that Egypt would deploy troops if Sirte were to be captured, which was viewed by the GNA as a declaration of war. The next day, Egypt deployed an undisclosed number of troops into Libya. Many politicians and news sources say due to Turkish military intervention in Libya from earlier in 2020.

References

Second Libyan Civil War
Egypt–Libya relations
Libya